The Avenue is a Canadian reality-based web series starring YouTube personality Gigi Gorgeous. The series premiered on January 25, 2011 on The Avenue YouTube channel.

Background and release 
The first season was distributed primarily on Blip with the second season only on YouTube. Scott Fisher, Jacob Morris and Stéphane Paré serve as executive producers and were all in their second year of studying at Ryerson University (now Toronto Metropolitan University).

The second season of The Avenue premiered in November 2012 with a larger concept. New characters had been added including Gregory's next door neighbor, Shannon. As well as his love interest, Jay. Aspiring fashion model, Jessica, did not return for a second season.

Controversy 
The series received some negative press attention for the way it portrayed Toronto, with VICE writing: "This isn’t the first time that self-involved rich kids have used their assets to transform their over privileged lives into what they think is quality television."

References

Toronto Metropolitan University
Canadian non-fiction web series